The Kingdom of Illyria was a crown land of the Austrian Empire from 1816 to 1849, the successor state of the Napoleonic Illyrian Provinces, which were reconquered by Austria in the War of the Sixth Coalition. It was established according to the Final Act of the Vienna Congress. Its administrative centre was in Ljubljana (officially )

Upon the Revolutions of 1848, the kingdom was dissolved and split into the Austrian crown lands of Carniola, Carinthia, and the Austrian Littoral.

Geography
The French Illyrian Provinces had comprised Carniola and western ("Upper") Carinthia as well as the Adriatic territories of Gorizia and Gradisca, Trieste and the Istrian peninsula. They had also included the Dalmatian coast and the lands of the Kingdom of Croatia south of the Sava River. Parts of the territories on the Adriatic Sea had been annexed by the Habsburg monarchy from Venice in the 1797 Treaty of Campo Formio. Upon the dissolution of the Provinces, the Austrian government split off Dalmatia and merged the eastern ("Lower") part of Carinthia into what was to become the Kingdom of Illyria.

The territory of the kingdom included the modern Austrian state of Carinthia and the western and central part of present-day Slovenia, i.e. Carniola with the capital Ljubljana, the Slovenian Littoral (Goriška and Slovenian Istria), and Slovenian Carinthia. It also included some territories in northwestern Croatia (present-day Istria County and the Kvarner Gulf islands of Krk, Cres and Lošinj) and northeastern Italy (eastern parts of the Friuli–Venezia Giulia region, i.e. the former Provinces of Trieste and Gorizia and some small parts of Udine around Tarvisio in the north east and Cervignano del Friuli in the south east). In 1822, Civil Croatia between the right bank of the Sava and Rijeka was again merged into the Habsburg Kingdom of Croatia.

History

The Kingdom of Illyria was formed to counter the territorial pretenses of the Kingdom of Hungary and the influences of the Russian Empire, but it lost on its significance with the Hungarian annexation of Civil Croatia and Rijeka. The legal and administrative reforms made by the former French authorities deeply transformed the administrative structures of these territories, so the Austrian Imperial authorities thought it better to group most of them as a separate administrative entity, enabling a slow incorporation into the Austrian legal, judicial and administrative system.

After the collapse of Napoleon's France, the Austrian monarchs gained full power over the territory of the former French Illyrian provinces. The idea of the creation of the Illyrian Kingdom developed for foreign and domestic reasons. Foreign policy causes include an attempt to halt the spread of Italian and Russian influence, while domestic policy seeks to maintain some French reforms, retain Hungarian influence and the need for the Habsburg court to replace the postwar interim military administration as soon as possible.

Emperor Franz I and Chancellor Klemens von Metternich relied on the current administrative situation in the then abolished Illyrian provinces. But due to the Congress of Vienna, work in the former Illyrian provinces stalled. Nevertheless, a special Illyrian court organizational commission was formed (1814–1815), and its work was completed by the court organizational commission .(1815–1817). Despite the mistrust, the court took advantage of some local lawyers, such as the knight Leopold Plenčič and Ivan Vilhar, the former French chief in Villach. A well-developed plan for the reorganization of the administration was created. While the new administrative system was being secretly prepared with the help of Slovene lawyers, court policy had to face the action of the Croatian bishop of Zagreb (Maksimilijan Vrhovac), who restored the old system in the northern part of civil Croatia, which was formerly part of the provinces.

On June 13, 1816, Emperor Francis I finally issued a decision to form a new political unit of the Illyrian Kingdom, and on August 3, 1816, he issued an imperial patent, with which this kingdom was finally established. Due to Croatian and Hungarian resistance, mainland Croatia was expelled from the kingdom as early as 1822. On the other hand, due to the resistance of the local nobility, the whole of Carinthia did not really come into being a kingdom until 1825.

Although the kingdom was given a unified ecclesiastical order in 1830, it never gained real political power. The emperor's opposition to Metternich's idea of ​​national chancellery initially prevented major changes, later the loss of Croatian lands led to a predominance of Slovene-speaking people, and from 1830 a Slovene-speaking metropolitan operated in Illyria. The Austrian court was afraid of uniting Slovene-speaking people, so as early as 1815 the Illyrian court's organizational commission made a proposal that the Ljubljana province (i.e., the higher administrative unit) should not be housed or that domestic (Slovene-speaking) domestic ones should be housed as little as possible. population.

Due to its marginal importance in the title of Austrian rulers, the Illyrian Kingdom has always appeared in the last place among the kingdoms, from Galicia and Lodomeria, from the very beginning . It existed as an administrative unit until 1849, but with the new constitution it was abolished in political terms and the old lands regained all crown provincial honors. The name of the Kingdom of Illyria has been appearing for some time now, mainly as a geographical term. Legally and formally, however, the Illyrian Kingdom continued to exist; until 1915, the emperor's patents contained the title of King of Illyria, and with the reform of October 10, 1915, the Illyrian coat of arms quietly disappeared from Austrian national heraldry.

The Kingdom of Illyria was officially established on 3 August 1816. It initially also included Croatian territory that was part of the Napoleonic . However, in the early 1820s the pre-Napoleonic Croatian kingdom was reestablished, which also included the territories which had formed part of the Kingdom of Illyria (the city of Rijeka/Fiume with eastern Istria and the province of Karlovac). 

In the Spring of Nations in 1848, Slovenes advanced a proposal to include Lower Styria in the Kingdom of Illyria, so most of the ethnically Slovene lands would be united in a single administrative entity and the idea of a United Slovenia would thus be achieved. Peter Kozler designed a map of such an enlarged Kingdom of Illyria, which would later become an important national symbol in Slovenian national consciousness. The proposal was, however, rejected by the Habsburg emperor. The Kingdom of Illyria was gradually mentioned less and less, and officially appeared for the last time in 1849 as a crown land in the March Constitution of Austria.

Administration

List of governors 
 1816–1817: Bernhard Anton Maria Vincenz, Freiherr von Rossetti zu Roseneck
 1817–1818: Karl Graf Chotek von Chotkow 
 1818–1823: Antonio Spiegelfeld 
 1823–1835: Prince Alfonso Gabriele Porcia 
 1835–1841: Joseph von Weingarten 
 1841–1847: Franz von Stadion 
 1847–1848: Franz von Gyulai 
 1848–1849: Roberto Algravio di Salam 
 1849: Major General Joseph Wenzel Ritter von Standeisky
 1849: Franz Wimpffen

See also

Illyria
Illyrian movement

References

Sources

External links
Map of Illyria
Kingdom of Illyria (at worldstatesmen.org)

Subdivisions of Austria-Hungary
Modern history of Slovenia
19th century in Austria-Hungary
19th century in Croatia
Istria
States and territories established in 1816
1816 establishments in the Austrian Empire
1849 disestablishments in Europe
Former kingdoms
Use of the term Illyrian in modern history